The slender argentine, Microstoma microstoma, is a species of pencil smelt, found around the world in tropical and subtropical areas.  This species grows to a length of  TL.
Its main food includes other fish, and its feces.

References
 
 Tony Ayling & Geoffrey Cox, Collins Guide to the Sea Fishes of New Zealand,  (William Collins Publishers Ltd, Auckland, New Zealand 1982) 

Microstomatidae
Fish described in 1810